Dunmurry Golf Club is located in Dunmurry Lane, south-west Belfast, Northern Ireland. It consists of an 18-hole course with a par of 70.

Founded in 1905, the club was originally located in Upper Dunmurry Lane. The original 9-hole course was designed and laid by G.S. Dunn of Newcastle, County Down, in 1905. The course was extended to 14 holes in 1973 and then to 18 holes in 1977. As a result of road improvements in the area, the club moved to a new course in Dunmurry Lane approximately one mile away from the previous course.

Honourable members include Dame Mary Peters who represented at the Summer Olympic Games for Team GB and for Northern Ireland in the Commonwealth Games winning Gold.

Scorecards

References

External links 
 Dunmurry Golf Club

Golf clubs and courses in Northern Ireland
Sports clubs in Belfast
Sports venues completed in 1905
1905 establishments in Ireland